is a Japanese actor and voice actor from Fukuoka Prefecture, Japan.

Biography
Yohei Tadano's interest in acting began in his elementary school years. In 1981, while studying at the University of the Ryukyus, he joined the production "Audience Seats" at the Okinawa Jean Jean festival. After graduating from college, he worked most immediately as a salesman, but later became involved with a series of theater companies. Tadano joined the Theater Echo Training Institute in 1988, and two years later became a research student at the same entity. He was named a troupe member in April 1994 and was further promoted in April 2000.

Tadano is currently active mainly on stage and in voice-over work. On February 27, 2019, he became Kitakyushu City's Tourism Ambassador.

His first voice-over assignment was in 1993 with the Japanese-language dubbing of the American film The Saint of Fort Washington. Dubbing assignments for western movies continued for some time, but from 2006 Tadano expanded into anime, first for Hime-sama Goyōjin.

For the 2009 TV dub of For a Few Dollars More, which restored scenes deleted from the 1973 theatrical cut, he was cast as Manco, replacing the late Yasuo Yamada. A dubbing staff member heard Tadano's performance in Hime-sama Goyōjin and said, "There's a guy who sounds like Lupin!", referring to Yamada's celebrated role. 
Tadano also dubbed Eastwood in restored scenes for the Japanese TV dub of The Good, the Bad and the Ugly as well.

He portrays characters ranging from young to old. He voiced Nucky Thompson in Boardwalk Empire and also performed as the comical villain King Candy in Wreck-It Ralph, Heinz Doofenshmirtz in Phineas and Ferb and Mr. Smee in Jake and the Never Land Pirates.

Since his face physically resembles Tadao Futami, a senior member of a well-known theater company, Tadano took on the stage role of Futami. Because his voice shares some similarities with Yasuo Yamada, a senior troupe member, Tadano often substitutes for Yamada when required.

When Ichirō Nagai passed away in 2014, Tadano was called on to assume Nagai's role of Yoda in Star Wars Rebels. In Kingdom Hearts III, he also replaced Kaneta Kimotsuki in his role as Jiminy Cricket. Tadano additionally has also served as a replacement for Takeshi Aono.

Filmography

Anime
Naruto: Shippūden (2010) as Chushin 
Kamiwaza Wanda (2016) as Jii Yoda
Little Witch Academia (2017) as Mr. Holbrooke
One Piece (2017) as Prodi
Layton Mystery Tanteisha: Katori no Nazotoki File (2018) as Darjeeling Aspoirot
Megalobox (2018) as Miyagi
Go Astro Boy Go! (2019) as Professor Ochanomizu
Star Twinkle PreCure (2019) as Ryoutarou Sorami and Yeti
BNA: Brand New Animal (2020) as Giuliano Flip
Great Pretender (2020) as Kudo
Dragon Quest: The Adventure of Dai (2020) as Baduck
Rick and Morty vs. Genocider (2020) as Rick Sanchez
Yu-Gi-Oh! Sevens (2020) as Sebastian
Log Horizon: Destruction of the Round Table (2021) as Regan
Beyblade Burst Dynamite Battle (2021) as Jingemon Daikokuten
Getter Robo Arc (2021) as Professor Shikishima

Video games
Street Fighter IV (2008) – Gen
Super Street Fighter IV (2010) – Gen
Ni no Kuni: Wrath of the White Witch (2011) – Abull
Shin Megami Tensei IV (2013) – Hugo
Street Fighter V (2016) – Gen 
Dragon Quest Heroes II (2016) – King Felnorc
Nioh (2017) – Kanbei Kuroda, Muramasa Senji
Shin Megami Tensei: Strange Journey Redux (2017) – Captain Jack
Kingdom Hearts III (2019) – Jiminy Cricket, Aliens
Yakuza: Like a Dragon (2020) – Nonomiya
Final Fantasy VII Remake (2020) – Don Corneo
Ghost of Tsushima (2020) - Ryuzo

unknown date

God of War III – Hermes
God of War – Mímir

Dubbing roles

Live-action
Clint Eastwood
A Fistful of Dollars (2012 Blu-Ray additional scenes), The Man with No Name
For a Few Dollars More (2009 DVD additional scenes), The Man with No Name
The Good, the Bad and the Ugly (2009 DVD additional scenes), The Man with No Name
Where Eagles Dare (2021 Movie Plus additional scenes), Lieutenant Morris Schaffer
The Beguiled (2017 VOD edition), Corporal John 'McBee' McBurney
Dirty Harry (2012 Wowow additional scenes), Inspector Harry Callahan
Magnum Force (2012 Wowow additional scenes), Inspector Harry Callahan 
The Enforcer (2012 Wowow additional scenes), Inspector Harry Callahan
The Gauntlet (2018 Wowow additional scenes), Detective Ben Shockley
Sudden Impact (2012 Wowow additional scenes), Inspector Harry Callahan
The Mule, Earl Stone
Cry Macho, Mike Milo
Willem Dafoe
The Great Wall, Sir Ballard
Aquaman, Nuidis Vulko
Motherless Brooklyn, Paul Randolph
Togo, Leonhard Seppala
The Last Thing He Wanted, Richard Dick McMahon
Zack Snyder's Justice League, Nuidis Vulko
Steve Buscemi
The Sopranos, Tony Blundetto
Boardwalk Empire, Enoch "Nucky" Thompson
Electric Dreams, Ed Morris
The Death of Stalin, Nikita Khrushchev
Hubie Halloween, Walter Lambert
Aladdin, Iago (Alan Tudyk)
Alice Through the Looking Glass, Gentleman Fish (Edward Petherbridge)
Alvin and the Chipmunks: Chipwrecked, Ian Hawke (David Cross)
The A-Team, H. M. "Howling Mad" Murdock (Sharlto Copley)
Black & White: The Dawn of Justice, Xu Da-fu (Huang Bo)
The Boondock Saints II: All Saints Day, Romeo (Clifton Collins Jr.)
Burlesque, Alexis (Alan Cumming)
The Captain, Reinhard Freitag (Milan Peschel)
Captain America: The First Avenger, Abraham Erskine (Stanley Tucci)
Constantine (2008 TV Asahi edition), Beeman (Max Baker)
Disaster Movie, Calvin (Gary "G Thang" Johnson)
Doctor Who, King James I (Alan Cumming)
Dough and Dynamite, Jacques (Chester Conklin)
The Extraordinary Adventures of Adèle Blanc-Sec, Justin de Saint-Hubert (Jean-Paul Rouve)
Final Cut, Rémi (Romain Duris)
Flypaper, Billy Ray 'Peanut Butter' McCloud (Tim Blake Nelson)
Fright Night 2: New Blood, Peter Vincent (Sean Power)
Game of Thrones, Stannis Baratheon (Stephen Dillane)
Hachi: A Dog's Tale, Carl Boilins (Jason Alexander)
Hannibal (Netflix edition), Dr. Cordell Doemling (Željko Ivanek)
Home Alone 2: Lost in New York (2019 Wowow additional scenes), Harry (Joe Pesci)
Home Alone 3 (2019 NTV edition), Earl Unger (David Thornton)
I Am Sam (NTV edition), Ifty (Doug Hutchinson)
The Illusionist, Josef Fischer (Eddie Marsan)
Instinct, Dr. Dylan Reinhart (Alan Cumming)
The Internship, Roger Chetty (Aasif Mandvi)
Interstellar, TARS (Bill Irwin)
Into the Blue, Bryce Dunn (Scott Caan)
The Invention of Lying, Traffic Cop (Edward Norton)
It Chapter One, Pennywise / It (Bill Skarsgård)
It Chapter Two, Pennywise / It (Bill Skarsgård)
John Wick: Chapter 3 - Parabellum, Elder (Saïd Taghmaoui)
The Kick, Uncle Mam (Petchtai Wongkamlao)
The Lady in the Van, Alan Bennett (Alex Jennings)
The Last Mercenary, Alexandre (Alban Ivanov)
Lovecraft Country, Montrose Freeman (Michael K. Williams)
Mad Dogs, Gus (Romany Malco)
Mad Max 2 (2015 Supercharger edition), The Gyro Captain (Bruce Spence)
The Marine 3: Homefront, Eckert (Michael Eklund)
Mary Poppins Returns, Séamus the Coachman Dog (Chris O'Dowd)
Million Dollar Arm, Ash (Aasif Mandvi)
Mojin: The Lost Legend, Wang Kaixuan (Huang Bo)
Nicky Larson et le parfum de Cupidon, Gilbert Skippy (Julien Arruti)
No Time to Die, Valdo Obruchev (David Dencik)
North Face (2020 BS Tokyo edition), Edi Rainer (Georg Friedrich)
Nurse Jackie, Eddie Walzer (Paul Schulze)
O Brother, Where Art Thou?, George Nelson (Michael Badalucco)
Ocean's 8, Lawrence (Richard Robichaux)
Once Upon a Time, Jiminy Cricket / Dr. Archibald Hopper (Raphael Sbarge)
Otis, Elmo Broth (Kevin Pollak)
Oz the Great and Powerful, Knuck (Tony Cox)
Paddington, Montgomery Clyde (Tim Downie)
The Pale Horse, Zachariah Osborne (Bertie Carvel)
Peter Rabbit, Banaman (Gareth Davies)
Perfect Sense, James (Ewen Bremner)
The Poseidon Adventure (BS-TBS edition), James Martin (Red Buttons)
A Prairie Home Companion, Dusty (Woody Harrelson)
Raw Deal (2021 Wowow additional scenes), Martin "The Hammer" Lamanski (Steven Hill)
Red Dragon (TV Tokyo edition, non-credit), Ralph Mandy (Frank Whaley)
Run Boy Run, SS Officer (Rainer Bock)
Santa et Cie, Santa (Alain Chabat)
The Sessions, Mark O'Brien (John Hawkes)
Seven Psychopaths, Charles "Charlie" Costello (Woody Harrelson)
Shark Attack 3: Megalodon, Davies (Nikolai Sotirov)
Snakehead Swamp, Chipmunk (Thomas Francis Murphy)
The Take, Felix De La Pena (John Leguizamo)
Terry Pratchett's The Colour of Magic, Rincewind (David Jason)
Thor: Love and Thunder, King Yakan (Stephen Curry)
Three Christs, Joseph Cassel (Peter Dinklage)
The Three Musketeers, Venetian Nobleman (Christian Oliver)
Time Bandits (Blu-ray Disk 35th anniversary edition), Robert (Derek Deadman)
Tooth Fairy, Duke (Brandon T. Jackson)
Transformers: Revenge of the Fallen, Mudflap (Reno Wilson)
Transformers: The Last Knight, Hot-Rod (Omar Sy)
Walk Hard: The Dewey Cox Story, Sam McPherson (Tim Meadows)
Where the Wild Things Are, Douglas (Chris Cooper)
White Collar, Mozzie (Willie Garson)
Yes Man, Nick Lane (John Michael Higgins)

Animation
The Addams Family 2 (Mr. Mustela)
The Adventures of Tintin (Mr. Crabtree)
Arthur Christmas (Elf Aide)
The Boss Baby (Francis E. Francis)
Brave (Martin)
Coco (Papá Julio)
Ferdinand (Angus)
Finding Dory (Bailey)
Happy Feet Two (Lombardo)
Home (Kyle)
Meet the Robinsons (Carl)
Moomins on the Riviera (Captain)
Mr. Peabody & Sherman (Mr. Peabody)
The Nut Job (Mole)
ParaNorman (Judge Hopkins)
Rango (Rattlesnake Jake, The Spirit of the West)
Rick and Morty (Rick Sanchez)
Shrek Forever After (Gnome Guide)
Solar Opposites (Korvo)
Soul (Jerry)
Space Jam: A New Legacy (Rick Sanchez)
Stillwater (Stillwater)
Wreck-It Ralph (King Candy / Turbo)

References

External links
 Official agency profile 
 
 

1962 births
Living people
Japanese male stage actors
Japanese male video game actors
Japanese male voice actors
Male voice actors from Fukuoka Prefecture
Voice actors from Kitakyushu
20th-century Japanese male actors
21st-century Japanese male actors